Mahonri Schwalger (born 15 September 1978) is a former Samoan professional rugby union footballer who last played in New Zealand for the Chiefs in the Super Rugby competition and for Counties Manukau in the National Provincial Championship. He captained the Samoan national team at the 2011 Rugby World Cup.

Club career
Born in Samoa, Schwalger moved to New Zealand in his youth and attended Waitakere College in Auckland. He made his provincial debut in 1999 for Hawke's Bay against Waikato, and went on to play 44 matches for the province.
Schwalger moved to Wellington for the 2004 provincial season, and his solid showing for the Lions saw him drafted to the Highlanders for the 2005 Super 12 season. He made 5 appearances for the Highlanders, serving as backup at hooker to All Black Anton Oliver.
After two more seasons with Wellington, Schwalger was selected to the Hurricanes for the 2007 Super 14 season. For the Hurricanes, he made 9 appearances including one start.
In 2007, Schwalger moved to Europe, signing with the Llanelli Scarlets in the Celtic League. After two seasons with the Scarlets, he signed with the Sale Sharks in the Guinness Premiership. Schwalgar left Sale at the start of the 2010–11 season to return to New Zealand, and signed with Taranaki for the remainder of the 2010 ITM Cup.
After a solid performance with Taranaki, Schwalger earned a Super Rugby contract with the Highlanders, where he previously played in 2005. He made 12 appearances including 5 starts over the course of the 2011 season.

After the Highlanders signing of Andrew Hore, Schwalger was surplus to requirements and signed with the Chiefs for the 2012 season.

In July 2012, Schwalger signed with Counties Manukau for the 2012 ITM Cup domestic competition in New Zealand for two seasons.

After three successful seasons with the Chiefs, including Super Rugby titles in 2012 and 2013, Schwalger retired from competitive rugby in 2014.

International career
Schwalger made his debut for the Samoan national team in 2000 against Wales and developed into a fixture for the side, representing them at the 2003 and 2007 Rugby World Cups. Noted for his leadership skills, he served as team captain at the 2011 Rugby World Cup. However, he was controversially dropped from the team in 2012 after criticizing team management.

He was also selected for the Pacific Islanders team to tour Europe at the end of 2006.

References

External links
 Chiefs profile
 Profile at wellingtonlions.co.nz
 Profile at rwc2003.irb.com
Highlanders Profile
itsrugby.co.uk profile

1978 births
Living people
Rugby union hookers
Samoan rugby union players
Chiefs (rugby union) players
Highlanders (rugby union) players
Hurricanes (rugby union) players
Scarlets players
Sportspeople from Apia
Samoa international rugby union players
Pacific Islanders rugby union players
Taranaki rugby union players
Wellington rugby union players
Hawke's Bay rugby union players
Counties Manukau rugby union players
Samoan emigrants to New Zealand
Samoan expatriate rugby union players
Expatriate rugby union players in England
Expatriate rugby union players in Wales
Samoan expatriate sportspeople in England
Samoan expatriate sportspeople in Wales
Samoan people of German descent
New Zealand people of German descent
People educated at Waitakere College